Alan Reeves may refer to:

Alan Reeves (footballer), British central defender
Alan Reeves (composer), British musician